Quileute Tribal School (QTS) is a Quileute, Native American school located in La Push, Washington. It is a K-12 school, serving students in grades kindergarten – 12. QTS is affiliated with the Bureau of Indian Education (BIE). It has a compact with the state of Washington and receives a grant from the BIE.

The school is accredited by AdvancED.

The school was founded in 1979.

There were ten elderly speakers of the Quileute language in 1977, and "a few" in 1999. The Quileute Nation is attempting to prevent the loss of the Quileute language by teaching it to students in the Quileute Tribal School, using books written for the students by the tribal elders. The Quileute Tribal School is the most common way that Quileutes spread their language that only 3 people, two in their 80s, speak fluently.

Move to higher ground
The school building was constructed in 1992, on low ground, close to the Pacific Ocean. This proximity to the ocean made the school vulnerable to storm surges as well as tsunami events.  In 2012, Barack Obama signed legislation that increased the size of the Quileute Indian Reservation by 785 acres, including a tract on ground higher than the rest of the village. The Quileute Tribe decided to construct a new school on the higher ground. In 2016, the Bureau of Indian Affairs selected the school for replacement through the No Child Left Behind Act. The tribe received a $44.1 million grant from the Bureau to relocate the school in 2018. Timber was harvested from the site and sold for some additional funding. Construction was estimated to cost around $500 per square foot for the new facilities. On 2 July 2020, ground was broken on construction of the new school. The new facilities are in a location safe from tsunami risk, and were designed to accommodate 175 students.

See also
 Quillayute Valley School District - The area school district

References

External links
 Quileute Tribal School website

Educational institutions established in 1971
Schools in Clallam County, Washington
High schools in Clallam County, Washington
Public middle schools in Washington (state)
Public elementary schools in Washington (state)
1971 establishments in Washington (state)
Public high schools in Washington (state)
Public K-12 schools in the United States
Native American K-12 schools